Six is the sixth studio album by The Black Heart Procession, released on October 6, 2009. This album was made after their switch to their new label, Temporary Residence Limited. This album incorporated some new elements into the Black Heart Procession's macabre style.

Track listing
 "When You Finish Me" – 3:30
 "Wasteland" – 4:07
 "Witching Stone" – 3:35
 "Rats" – 3:57
 "Heaven and Hell" – 4:28
 "Drugs" – 2:55
 "All My Steps" – 4:07
 "Forget My Heart" – 4:30
 "Liar's Ink" – 5:07
 "Suicide" – 3:54
 "Back to the Underground" – 4:00
 "Last Chance" – 4:14
 "Iri Sulu" – 4:30

Personnel
 Tobias Nathaniel
 Pall Jenkins
 Matt Resovich - Violin on 1, 4, 7, 8, 10, 11, 13
 Brad Lee - Bass, Drums, Co-Writing on 8
 Mario Rubalacaba - Drums on 9
 Joshua Quon - Bass on 9

References

2009 albums
The Black Heart Procession albums
Temporary Residence Limited albums